Sanctuary Wood is an area east of Ypres, Belgium which was the site of fighting on the Ypres Salient in World War I.

Memorials
 Hill 62 Memorial
 Sanctuary Wood Commonwealth War Graves Commission Cemetery
 Sanctuary Wood Museum Hill 62

See also
 Battle of Ypres

References

Ypres Salient